Bhone Manzabta is a village and union council in Okara District, Punjab, Pakistan. It is part of Depalpur Tehsil. Bhone Manzebta is situated equidistant between Basirpur and Hujra Shahmuqeem. 

Bhone Manzebta village is of considerable antiquity and is located near Behlolpur.

The village has two access roads. One issues from the Basirpur-Depalpur road at Thokar Gama Wahgra and passes through villages Dhabby and Somian Bholo. The other issues from the Hujra-Haveli road at the point of Paeray Wala. The population is predominantly agriculturist. The village is inhabited by Dogars (the family of Sardar Noor Ahmad Dogar) who seek the betterment of the people of Bhone Manzabta, followed by his sons Sardar Haji Muhammad Dais, Haji Muhammad Nawaz and Sardar Muhammad Ali. They always think about the people of the village. Later Sardar Ahmad Hassan Dogar had a seat of vice chairman. Sardar Saleem Haider Dogar was a Consular who migrated to the village from India on the eve of partition in 1948. Bhone Manzabta is a village full of old memories like the gate of Sukha House and a gurdwara which shows the old civilization of this village. All the facilities are available here: Govt Middle School for boys and primary school for girls, union council, a BHQ and a hospital for animals.

References

Villages in Okara District
Union councils of Okara District